

r
R-Gel
R-Gene 10
R-P Mycin

ra

rab-raf
rabeprazole (INN)
rabeximod (USAN)
racecadotril (INN)
racefemine (INN)
racefenicol (INN)
racementhol (INN)
racemethorphan (INN)
racemetirosine (INN)
racemoramide (INN)
racemorphan (INN)
racephedrine (INN)
racepinefrine (INN)
raclopride (INN)
racotumomab (INN)
ractalind (INN)
ractopamine (INN)
radafaxine (USAN)
radavirsen (USAN)
radezolid (USAN, INN)
Radiogardase
radotinib (INN)
radretumab (INN)
rafivirumab (INN)
rafoxanide (INN)

ral-ran
ralitoline (INN)
ralitrexed (INN)
raloxifene (INN)
raltegravir (USAN)
ramatroban (INN)
ramciclane (INN)
ramelteon (USAN)
ramifenazone (INN)
ramipril (INN)
ramiprilat (INN)
ramixotidine (INN)
ramnodigin (INN)
ramoplanin (INN)
ramorelix (INN)
ramosetron (INN)
ramucirumab (USAN)
ranagengliotucel-T (USAN)
ranelic acid (INN)
ranibizumab (INN)
Raniclor
Ranihexal (Hexal Australia) [Au]. Redirects to ranitidine.
ranimustine (INN)
ranimycin (INN)
ranitidine (INN)
ranolazine (INN)
ranpirnase (INN)

rap-raz
rapacuronium bromide (INN)
Rapamune
Raplon
rasagiline (INN, USAN)
rasburicase (INN)
raseglurant (INN)
rathyronine (INN)
Rau-Sed
Raudixin
Rauserpin
Rautensin
Rauval
Rauverid
Rauvolfia serpentina
Rauwiloid
ravatirelin (INN)
Ravocaine
Raxar
raxibacumab (USAN)
raxofelast (INN)
razinodil (INN)
razobazam (INN)
razoxane (INN)
razupenem (USAN, INN)

rb-rc
RBC-Scan
RC Lice